Gold and Luck is a 1923 German silent film directed by Adolf Trotz and starring Conrad Veidt, Erna Morena and Eduard von Winterstein. An independent production by the Hamburg-based Mercator-Film, it is now considered a lost film.

The film's sets were designed by the art director Robert Neppach.

Cast
 Conrad Veidt as The Count
 Erna Morena as Schöne
 Eduard von Winterstein as Bauer
 Georg John as Wucherer
 Margarete Kupfer as Komödiantin
 Carl Heinz Klubertanz as Arbeiter
 Margot Nemo as Krankenschwester
 Walter Neumann as Gelehrter
 Erich Völker as Pfarrer

References

Bibliography
 John T. Soister. Conrad Veidt on Screen: A Comprehensive Illustrated Filmography. McFarland, 2002.

External links

1923 films
Films of the Weimar Republic
German silent feature films
Films directed by Adolf Trotz
German black-and-white films
1923 drama films
German drama films
Lost German films
Silent drama films
1920s German films